The 2008 Scottish Labour Party deputy leadership election was an internal party election to choose a new deputy leader of the Labour Party in the  Scottish Parliament, and was triggered following the resignation of Cathy Jamieson, who stood down in order to campaign in the leadership election which is being held alongside the deputy leadership election. Johann Lamont won the election and was elected deputy leader on Saturday 13 September.

The timetable for the election was finalised on Monday 28 July, and is identical to that of the leadership election. Nominations closed on Friday 1 August with the result declaration being made on 13 September.

Successfully nominated candidates
Johann Lamont – nominated by 18 MSPs
Bill Butler – nominated by 7 MSPs

Both of the declared candidates received more than five nominations from MSPs, which was the minimum requirement for them to get onto the ballot paper, by the close of nominations at 12:00 UTC+1 on 1 August 2008.

Nominations

Candidates are initially nominated by their parliamentary colleagues from within the Scottish Parliament, following which Westminster MPs, constituency Labour parties and affiliated trade union organisation can submit 'supporting nominations', providing their backing to a specific candidates. These nominations can be seen in the tables below:

Result
The election took place using Alternative Vote in an electoral college, with a third of the votes allocated to Labour's MSPs, Scottish MPs and Scottish MEPs, a third to individual members of the Scottish Labour Party, and a third to individual members of affiliated organisations, mainly trade unions.

In order to be elected, one candidate must have achieved a majority of votes, i.e. 50% plus 1 vote.

Source: The Citizen: Campaigning for Socialism

Suggested candidates not standing
The following either publicly suggested they would stand for election or received media speculation to that effect. However, at the close of nominations they had not been nominated by any MSPs.

Des McNulty has said he would "be inviting support from Holyrood colleagues". McNulty ultimately nominated Johann Lamont.
Margaret Curran. Originally intended to stand in the leadership election; however she subsequently stood in and lost the Glasgow East by-election on 24 July, raising questions over any leadership or deputy leadership ambitions. Curran ultimately nominated Johann Lamont.

Timeline of events

See also 
 2008 Scottish Labour Party leadership election

References 

2008 elections in the United Kingdom
2008
2008 in Scotland
2000s elections in Scotland
Scottish Labour deputy leadership election